The Maleia is a left tributary of the river Jiul de Est in Romania. It flows into the Jiul de Est in the city Petroșani.

References

Rivers of Romania
Rivers of Hunedoara County